Morgan Emmalise Crisostomo Brown (born October 20, 1995) is a footballer who plays as a defender. Born in the United States, she represents the Philippines women's national team.

Early life
Brown was born on October 20, 1995 to Curtis and Susan Brown and has two sisters.

High school
Brown, a native of Chino Hills, California played for the women's soccer team of Ruben S. Ayala High School under coach Jeffrey Allen. Her team was the undefeated champions of the 2010-11 Sierra League, the quarter finalists of the 2010 CIF-SS D2 and 2012 CIF D3, the finalist of the 2011 CIF D3. Ruben S. Ayala also participated in the CIF State Playoffs in 2011. She also received individual awards and honors such as the All-CIF-SS D2 Third-Team in 2009–10, Athletic Sierra League Award First-Team Defense in 2010, Athletic All ALeague Award 2nd team in 2011 and the Sierra League Defensive MVP in 2012.

Youth
Aside from playing women's soccer or association football in high school, Brown also played for the FRAM CA Premiere GU17 helping the team win the CSL Premier League Champions, Surf Cup and West Coast Futball Classic titles in 2011. The following year she helped FRAM Premiere win the Far West Regional League Spring Season, Cal South National Cup, and Surf/College Cup titles.

College soccer
Morgan Brown entered the Santa Clara University to pursue a major degree in psychology and a minor degree in urban education. She played for the Santa Clara Broncos women's soccer team. In her freshman year in 2013 she started in two matches in nine matches she played.

International career
At the 2014 AFC Women's Asian Cup qualifiers in May 2013, Brown played for the Philippines women's national football team. Brown debuted in the Philippines' match against Iran which it won 6–0.

Brown was named into the final 23-player squad of the Philippines women's national football team for the 2018 AFC Women's Asian Cup.

References

External links

1995 births
Living people
Citizens of the Philippines through descent
Filipino women's footballers
Women's association football defenders
Philippines women's international footballers
Filipino people of African-American descent
Sportspeople from Los Angeles County, California
Soccer players from California
American women's soccer players
Santa Clara Broncos women's soccer players
African-American women's soccer players
American sportspeople of Filipino descent